Asavdy (Asawźı) is a rural locality (a village) in Kalmiyarovsky Selsoviet, Tatyshlinsky District, Bashkortostan, Russia. The population was 110 as of 2010. There are 2 streets.

Geography 
Asavdy is located 20 km south of Verkhniye Tatyshly (the district's administrative centre) by road. Savkiyaz is the nearest rural locality.

References 

Rural localities in Tatyshlinsky District